Craggs may refer to:

Places
 Craggs, Florida, United States

People
 Charlie Craggs, British transgender activist and author
 Fred Craggs, New Zealand association football player
 Helen Millar Craggs (1888–1969), British suffragette and pharmacist
 Jack Craggs (1880–?), English footballer
 James Craggs the Elder (1657–1721), English politician
 James Craggs the Younger (1686–1721), English politician, son of James Craggs the Elder
 John Craggs (songwriter) (1849–?), English poet
 John Craggs (footballer) (born 1948), English footballer
 Kenneth Cragg (1913–2012), Anglican bishop and scholar

See also
 The Marvellous Craggs, English acrobatic troupe
 Cragg (disambiguation)